Lipna or Lipná may refer to the following places:

Lipna, Lesser Poland Voivodeship (south Poland)
Lipna, Łódź Voivodeship (central Poland)
Lipna, Lubusz Voivodeship (west Poland)
Lipná (Hazlov), village in Karlovy Vary Region, Czech Republic